Ain Al Nuaman is a village in north-west Qatar, located in the municipality of Ash Shamal. It is roughly 91 km away from the capital Doha, and is close to the ruins of Zubarah. Largely an agricultural settlement, the area is characterized by its large concentration of farms and gardens, with little else in the way of public infrastructure. According to the Ministry of Environment, there were about six households in the village in 2014.

Etymology
Named after a local well, the first constituent of the village's name, "ain", refers to a natural source of water in Arabic. The second part, "Nuaman" was the family name of the individual who built the well which supplied water to the village. Another variant of the name is Ain Al Noman.

Infrastructure
The condition of roads is poor in the village. Currently, only a one-lane road runs through the village center and does not have adequate lighting. There is also a marked absence of commercial establishments in the village.

Gallery

References

External links
Ain Al Nuaman at geographic.org

Populated places in Al Shamal